Jiang Jin (born October 17, 1968 in Tianjin) is a former Chinese international football goalkeeper.

He was the first-choice goalkeeper for China during the 2002 FIFA World Cup. Along with his older brother Jiang Hong he also became a goalkeeper and started his career playing for Bayi Football Team before moving to Tianjin Teda, Shanghai International and Shanghai Stars. After a short stint as an assistant coach for Shanghai Stars he moved away from football. On October 17, 2010 he was detained by the police for his involvement in fixing a league game against Tianjin Teda F.C. on November 30, 2003. Subsequently he was sentenced to five and a half years imprisonment on June 13, 2012.

Club career
Jiang Jin began his football career playing for Bayi Football Team during the 1987 league season and gradually established himself within the team. During his time with Bayi it became a fully professional football team and despite finding it difficult to transition to professionalism, Jiang was a steady constant within the team. By the 1996 league season his consistency started to pay off when he aided Bayi to third position within the league, which led to an eventual call-up to the national team. While his international career grew from strength to strength, Bayi were struggling within the league until the team were relegated at the end of the end of the 1998 league season. Jiang stayed for a short period before joining Tianjin Teda where he remained for three seasons before joining the highly ambitious side Shanghai International in the 2003 league season that saw his side just miss out on the league title. The next season saw him only make sixteen league appearances and being dropped from being the first choice goalkeeper. This led to Jiang joining second-tier side Shanghai Stars where he was offered an assistant post as well before he retired in 2007.

International career
Jiang Jin was first called up to the senior China team in 1993; however he had to wait until October 31, 1997 before he was given his chance to make his senior debut in 1998 FIFA World Cup qualifier against Qatar in a 3-2 defeat. Under Bobby Houghton Jiang was given an opportunity to establish himself as the country's first choice goalkeeper and it was during the 1998 Asian Games held in Bangkok that Jiang shone, by aiding the country to a third place finish and personally winning the “Asian best goalkeeper” award.

Match-fixing

On October 17, 2010, Jiang Jin was reported to have been detained by the police and was said to be involved in fixing the November 30, 2003 league game against Tianjin Teda F.C. during his stint as a player at Shanghai International. The allegations suggested that his team mate Shen Si was bribed by former Tianjin Teda general manager Yang Yifeng with a total of 12 million Yuan to lose the game and that Shen had asked team mates Jiang Jin, Qi Hong and Li Ming (1975) to help him. After being arrested by the police, a lengthy wait for trial eventually saw Jiang Jin found guilty of match-fixing. He was sentenced to five and a half years imprisonment on June 13, 2012 and fined 500,000 Yuan along with his associates, except for Shen Si who was given six years.

Honours
As a player

Club
Bayi Football Team
Chinese FA Cup: 1990

Country
Football at the Asian Games: 1998 (Bronze)

Individual
Asian Cup : 2000 Best Goalkeeper, All-Star Team
AFC Asian All Stars: 2000

References

External links

Player profile at the 2002 World Cup

1968 births
Living people
Association football goalkeepers
Chinese footballers
Footballers from Shanghai
China international footballers
2002 FIFA World Cup players
2000 AFC Asian Cup players
Bayi Football Team players
Tianjin Jinmen Tiger F.C. players
Beijing Renhe F.C. players
Pudong Zobon players
Asian Games medalists in football
Footballers at the 1998 Asian Games
Asian Games bronze medalists for China
Medalists at the 1998 Asian Games